The Mississippi Gulf Coast Open was a golf tournament on the Buy.com Tour from 1999 to 2000. It was played at The Oaks Golf Club in Pass Christian, Mississippi.

The purse in 2000 was US$400,000, with $72,000 going to the winner.

Winners

See also
Mississippi Gulf Coast Classic - an earlier Mississippi Gulf Coast tournament

Former Korn Ferry Tour events
Golf in Mississippi
Recurring sporting events established in 1999
Recurring sporting events disestablished in 2000